Steven O'Brien (born 22 December 1994) is an Irish Gaelic footballer and hurler who has played for the Tipperary senior hurling and football teams.

Born in Ballina, County Tipperary, O'Brien first played competitive Gaelic games during his schooling at Nenagh CBS. He arrived on the inter-county scene at the age of fifteen when he first linked up with the Tipperary minor teams as a dual player before later joining the under-21 sides. He made his senior football debut during the 2013 championship. O'Brien immediately became a regular member of the starting fifteen.

At club level O'Brien is a one-time championship medallist in the intermediate grade as a hurler with Ballina.

O'Brien made his debut for the Tipperary hurlers in the 2014 Waterford Crystal Cup final victory against Clare and was a member of the Tipperary hurling panel in 2016 which went on to win the All-Ireland title. He made his debut as a late substitute against Clare on 3 April 2016. He made his first league start for Tipperary against Dublin on 11 February 2017 in the 2017 National Hurling League.

In October 2017, O'Brien confirmed that he will be playing with the Tipperary senior football team in 2018 after two years with the Tipperary hurling team.

On 22 November 2020, Tipperary won the 2020 Munster Senior Football Championship after a 0-17 to 0-14 win against Cork in the final. It was Tipperary's first Munster title in 85 years.

Honours

Player

Ballina
Tipperary Intermediate Hurling Championship (1): 2013
North Tipperary Junior A Football Championship (2): 2020, 2021
Tipperary Junior A Football Championship (1): 2021

St Joseph's CBS, Nenagh 
Dr. Croke Cup (1): 2011-12

Tipperary Football
National League (Division 4) (1): 2015
Munster Under-21 Football Championship (1): 2015
All-Ireland Minor Football Championship (1): 2011
Munster Minor Football Championship (2): 2011, 2012
Munster Senior Football Championship (1): 2020

Tipperary Hurling
All-Ireland Senior Hurling Championship (1): 2016
Munster Senior Hurling Championship (1): 2016
All-Ireland Minor Hurling Championship (1): 2012
Munster Minor Hurling Championship (1): 2012
Waterford Crystal Cup (1): 2014

References

1994 births
Living people
Ballina hurlers
Ballina Gaelic footballers
Tipperary inter-county Gaelic footballers
Tipperary inter-county hurlers